"Feels Like Summer" is a song by the American rock band Weezer. It was released on March 16, 2017 as the lead single for their 2017 album Pacific Daydream. The song was performed for the first time at SXSW on March 17, 2017.

Composition 
The song has been described as a pop rock, electropop, dance-pop, and EDM song by various critics.

Music video
The music video for "Feels Like Summer" released on March 16, 2017 features animated versions of the band's members.

Versions
Two versions of the song were officially released by the band. The first one being the radio and single version and the second one the acoustic version of the song, released on June 28, 2017.

Single Version – 3:15
Acoustic version – 3:16

Commercial performance
The song was a sleeper hit, becoming Weezer's most successful single since 2008's "Pork and Beans". It peaked at number one on the Mediabase Alternative chart and number two on the Billboard Alternative Songs chart. The song was heard on The Weather Channel's Local on the 8s segments as well as some of the channel's promos in the summer of 2017. The song was also featured in the FIFA 18 soundtrack.

Chart performance

Weekly charts

Year-end charts

References

2017 singles
Songs written by Rivers Cuomo
Weezer songs
American pop rock songs
Dance-pop songs
Electropop songs
Songs written by J. R. Rotem
Song recordings produced by J. R. Rotem
2017 songs
Songs written by Jonny Coffer